Stegosaurus is one of the most recognizable types among cultural depictions of dinosaurs. It has been depicted on film, in cartoons, comics, as children's toys, as sculpture, and even was declared the state dinosaur of Colorado in 1982. Stegosaurus is a subject for inclusion in dinosaur toy and scale model lines, such as the Carnegie Collection.

As late as the 1970's, Stegosaurus, along with other dinosaurs, was depicted in fiction as a slow-moving, dim-witted creature. The "dinosaur renaissance" changed the prevailing image of dinosaurs as sluggish and cold-blooded and this reevaluation has been reflected in popular media.

Literature
A sketch of a Stegosaurus (based on a drawing by Ray Lydekker) forms an important plot point in the opening chapters of The Lost World by Arthur Conan Doyle.

In Tarzan at the Earth's Core, by Edgar Rice Burroughs, Jason Gridley encounters a Stegosaurus in Pellucidar, the world within the Earth. The animal jumps from a height and uses its plates as a gliding mechanism to chase and attack him; the real animal likely could not perform such an act.

Evelyn Sibley Lampman's The Shy Stegosaurus of Cricket Creek is a children's book about twins who find a talking Stegosaurus on their ranch in Oregon. She also wrote a sequel, The Shy Stegosaurus of Indian Springs.

The main hero and protagonist of Steve Cole's Astrosaurs series is an anthropomorphic Stegosaurus named Captain Teggs.

In Michael Crichton's 1990 novel Jurassic Park, the main characters come across a sick Stegosaurus at the south of Isla Nublar. It would later be replaced by a Triceratops in the movie adaptation.

Cinema
In the 1933 monster film King Kong, the first creature that the band of rescuers meet, as they chase the abducted Fay Wray deep into Skull Island, is a roaring Stegosaurus, which charges. In the 2005 Peter Jackson remake Stegosaurus is nowhere to be seen, although in the extended edition the Triceratops-like fictional Ferrucutus takes its place. A hypothetical descendant of Stegosaurus, called Atercurisaurus, appears in the tie-in book The World of Kong.

Walt Disney's 1940 animated film Fantasia features a harrowing battle between a Stegosaurus and a Tyrannosaurus rex during a segment based on The Rite of Spring by Igor Stravinsky as performed by Leopold Stokowski and the Philadelphia Symphony Orchestra, which depicts the history of life on Earth. (However, this conflicts with the scientific fact that the two genera did not co-exist at the same time in history.) The infamous scene is echoed by a display at the Denver Museum of Nature and Science which shows a Stegosaurus facing off with an Allosaurus.

Over the years, Stegosaurus has often been pitted in battle against large carnivorous dinosaurs, on both the big and small screen. It came up against Ceratosaurus in Journey to the Beginning of Time (1954), in The Animal World (1956), in the PBS mini-series The Dinosaurs! (1992), in the documentary When Dinosaurs Roamed America (2001), and in Jurassic Fight Club (2008) where it also faces Allosaurus. It faced Allosaurus in the first episode of the French animated series Once Upon a Time... Man (1978), in the anime series Kyouryuu Wakusei (Dinosaur Planet) (1993–94), in Dinosaur Valley Girls (1996), in episode two of Walking with Dinosaurs (1999), as well as in the special The Ballad of Big Al (2000), in episode three of the German cartoon series Albert Asks What is Life? (2002), in Mammals vs. Dinos (2008), and in Planet Dinosaur (2011). It has even been pitted against Tyrannosaurus in Walt Disney's Fantasia (1940) (which was the first time the defense of the spike tail was seen), in Planet of Dinosaurs (1978),  in the cartoon series Dino Riders (1988), in the remake of the series Land of the Lost (1991–92), in the anime television series Dinosaur King (2007–08), and in the opening scene of The Land Before Time XIV: Journey of the Brave (2016). On one occasion, it confronted Spinosaurus in the television series Dino Dan (2010).

An ailing Stegosaurus is encountered by the characters in the novel Jurassic Park, but was replaced by a Triceratops in the film version. Although it makes no actual appearance in the film, the name is used; it is on one of the embryo vials stolen (misspelled as Stegasaurus). A group of Stegosaurus also appeared The Lost World: Jurassic Park, as one of the first dinosaurs to be seen, although they were depicted as far larger than the actual animal. They also were seen briefly in Jurassic Park III, Jurassic World, Jurassic World: Fallen Kingdom and Jurassic World Dominion.

Stegosaurus is one of the three dinosaur types whose physical characteristics were combined by the designers at Toho, to create the Japanese monster Godzilla; the other two dinosaurs were Tyrannosaurus and Iguanodon. In the American version of King Kong vs. Godzilla this is remarked upon by a reporter, claiming Godzilla was half-Stegosaurus, half-Tyrannosaurus.

Television
Stegosaurus has also featured in several television series. A Stegosaurus has also appeared in one episode of Doctor Who. More recently, in 2010, a Stegosaurus appeared in the first Series 4 Prequel Webisode of the ITV series Primeval. It was incorrectly shown as having a horn on its head. This is due to the fact that, instead of creating another model for the Stegosaurus entirely, the special effects team decided to use the same Embolotherium model, which they had previously used, earlier on, in the making of Episode 3.9 of Primeval. In the episode "Do Shapeshifters Dream of Electric Sheep?" of Fringe, Stegosaurus second brain is mentioned as William Bell's design choice for shape-shifters' memory storage unit. Stegosaurus has been featured in numerous television documentaries, such as:
 Walking with Dinosaurs
 The Ballad of Big Al
 Jurassic Fight Club
 When Dinosaurs Roamed America.
 The fourth episode of the 2011 BBC series Planet Dinosaur
 A skeleton of the stegosaurus was seen in the Thomas and Friends ninth series episode Rheneas and The Dinosaur
 In the Bob the Builder episode Scoop’s Stegosaurus Scoop finds bones of a Stegosaurus while he, Bob and Lofty are repairing Farmer Pickles’ drain.

Cartoons and comics
Stegosaurus has also often been featured in children's cartoons. The Transformers toyline and related television series features four characters which can transform into stegosaurids: Snarl, Slugfest, Saberback and Striker. In The Land Before Time and its sequels, the character Spike is a young Stegosaurus. In the 1980s cartoon Dinosaucers, the character Stego is an anthropomorphic Stegosaurus who, while still only a trainee soldier, accomplishes difficult tasks despite his inexperience. Several Stegosaurus also appear in the 1989 animated TV series Dink the Little Dinosaur. In the Disney Afternoon cartoon series Darkwing Duck, the character Stegmutt is an anthropomorphic duck transformed into a humanoid Stegosaurus. Also, Stegz was an anthropomorphic stegosaur featured in the series Extreme Dinosaurs. Ironically, despite the tiny brain size of Stegosaurus, he was the most intelligent of the characters in the show. One of the Dino Knights and Drago Clones in Dinozaurs were Dino Stego and his evil counterpart Drago Stegus. In the YouTube series "asdfmovie'''," there is a running gag that a character would get crushed by a foot, and the camera zooms out to show a dinosaur who looks nothing like a Stegosaurus (no back plates, longer neck, taller structure, and longer tail). Then the dinosaur says, "I am a Stegosaurus!"

Gary Larson's The Far Side comic strip often used stegosaurs when he showed dinosaurs. The term "thagomizer" originated as a joke from a Far Side comic strip, in which a group of cavemen in a lecture hall are taught by their caveman professor that the spikes were named in honor of "the late Thag Simmons" (the implication is that the thagomizer was responsible for Thag's death). The term has been popularly adopted by many palaeontological authorities, including the Smithsonian Institution.

Science

In September 2002, a hoax poster was presented at the Society of Vertebrate Paleontology entitled "The case for Stegosaurus as an agile, cursorial biped", ostensibly by T. R. Karbek (an anagram of R. T. Bakker) from the non-existent "Steveville Academy of Palaeontological Studies". This was reported in New Scientist magazine, where it was remarked that Stegosaurus was generally believed to be "about as cursorial as a fridge-freezer".

Sculpture

Sculptor Jim Gary created several, almost-life-sized versions of Stegosaurus. Beginning in the 1960s, one always was displayed among his traveling exhibition, Jim Gary's Twentieth Century Dinosaurs, and they are frequently used as an illustration of his work in books and articles about the artist because of their distinctive characteristics. One of these was displayed for months before the electrical engineering research facility at the University of North Carolina at Charlotte during a 2005 campus-wide display of the exhibition, which was hosted by Belk College, and became a mascot of sorts to students studying in nearby buildings. Howard the Duck walked under a Jim Gary Stegosaurus when a museum display of Gary's work was used as a set for the 1986 film.

In 1973 Alexander Calder also created a huge sculpture called, Stegosaurus, that was more abstract than Gary's. It stands 50 feet tall in Hartford, Connecticut.

Theme parks
A battle between a Stegosaurus and a Tyrannosaurus rex similar to The Rite of Spring segment in the 1940 Disney animated film Fantasia was created using new Audio-Animatronics for Disney's Magic Skyway attraction at the 1964 World's Fair. When the Fair ended, the attraction was dismantled. However, in 1966 the dinosaurs were moved next to the Grand Canyon Diorama along the Disneyland Railroad to make the Primeval World. Tokyo Disneyland's Western River Railroad has the same diorama. A similar scene is depicted in Epcot's Universe of Energy pavilion. The Stegosaurus appearing in the various Universal Studios theme parks attraction Jurassic Park: The Ride, also known as Jurassic Park River Adventure in Universal's Islands of Adventure.

OtherStegosaurus has long been featured in popular informational books about dinosaurs. This is ostensibly due to its status as being one of the most famous dinosaurs in popular culture. Several older nonfiction books incorrectly stated that Stegosaurus had two brains, due to a mistake made by Marsh during the 1800s, in which a bundle of nerves located in the hips was thought to be a "second brain". However, newer informational works have corrected this, and most nonfiction dinosaur books published nowadays correctly state that Stegosaurus had only one — albeit tiny — brain, located in its skull, as all other known vertebrates do. Stegosaurus has also featured in numerous video games such as Zoo Tycoon: Dinosaur Digs, Ark: Survival Evolved and Carnivores. In the latter game, the animal was depicted as an awkward, lumbering reptile, similar to many outdated illustrations, even though the game was released in 1998, at least a decade after the general public recognized Stegosaurus and other dinosaurs as active warm-blooded beasts. Players can play as Stegosaurus in Combat of Giants. A stuffed Stegosaurus makes an appearance in the video game Gone Home'', nicknamed Steggy.

See also
 Timeline of stegosaur research

References

External links
 Steggie – Stegosaurus ungulatus
 Who's Wally?

Dinosaurs in popular culture
Fiction about dinosaurs
Popular culture